Neftali Manzambi (born 23 April 1997) is a footballer who plays as a forward for Winterthur. Born in Angola, he is a youth international for Switzerland.

Club career

Basel
The family Manzambi fled from Angola to Switzerland after Neftali's Birth. After playing his early football at FC La Chaux-de-Fonds and Xamax, Manzambi graduated with through FC Basel's youth system and advance to their U-21 team in 2014. He played regularly with the team and on 29 January 2016 he signed his first professional contract with the club, but stayed with the team.

Having already played eight test games with the first team, Manzambi was called up by Basel's head coach Urs Fischer for the game against FC Thun on 14 May 2017 and he played his Swiss Super League debut this 3–3 draw being substituted in during the 75th minute. On 8 June 2017 FC Basel 1893 extended Neftali Manzambi's contract, which would have expired at the end of the month, by a further three years, until the end of June 30 2020.

Having scored seven goals for the U-21 team in nine games, Manzambi joined Basel's first team on a perminant basis during the winter break of their 2017–18  season under head coach Raphaël Wicky. 

Manzambi played his first game over 90 minutes in the home game in the St. Jakob-Park on 29 April 2018. He scored his first goal for the team in the same game, it was the team's third goal as Basel won 6–1 against Thun. Manzambi was named as man of the match.

On 7 August 2018 Manzambi left the club. During his time with Basel's first team, Manzambi played a total of 23 games for them scoring a total of 4 goals. Nine of these games were in the Swiss Super League and 14 were friendly games. He scored one goal in the domestic league, the other three were scored during the test games.

Sporting Gijón
During July 2018, Manzambi joined Spanish Segunda División side Sporting de Gijón on a trial basis. On 7 August, he agreed to a one-year loan deal, with a buyout clause. Basel confirmed the deal on the same day.

On 30 January 2019, Sporting activated his buyout clause, with Manzambi signing a three-year contract and being immediately loaned to fellow second division side Córdoba CF until the end of the season. He subsequently failed to establish himself at Sporting, and served loan stints at Valencia CF Mestalla and Mjällby AIF.

Winterthur
On 6 July 2021, he returned to Switzerland and signed with Winterthur.

Honours 
Basel
 Swiss Super League: 2016–17

References

External links
 
 
 SFV U21 Profile
 SFV U20 Profile

1997 births
Living people
Footballers from Luanda
Swiss men's footballers
Switzerland youth international footballers
Angolan men's footballers
Angolan emigrants to Switzerland
Swiss people of Angolan descent
Swiss sportspeople of African descent
Association football forwards
FC Basel players
Sporting de Gijón B players
Sporting de Gijón players
Córdoba CF players
Valencia CF Mestalla footballers
Mjällby AIF players
FC Winterthur players
Swiss Promotion League players
Swiss Super League players
Segunda División players
Segunda División B players
Allsvenskan players
Swiss Challenge League players
Swiss expatriate footballers
Angolan expatriate footballers
Swiss expatriate sportspeople in Spain
Swiss expatriate sportspeople in Sweden
Expatriate footballers in Spain
Expatriate footballers in Sweden